Fredrick Ollie Taylor (born February 5, 1948, in Houston, Texas) is a retired American professional basketball player. He attended the University of Texas–Pan American and played for the Cincinnati Royals and Phoenix Suns in the NBA.

References

External links
1961-62 Henry Iba Award

1948 births
Living people
American expatriate basketball people in Spain
American men's basketball players
Basketball players from Houston
Cincinnati Royals players
Phoenix Suns draft picks
Phoenix Suns players
Shooting guards
Small forwards
Texas–Pan American Broncs men's basketball players